Cobboldites Kobayashi, 1943,  is a genus of Eodiscinid trilobite belonging to the family Weymouthiidae Kobayashi T. (1943), Order Agnostida (Salter 1864)  It lived during the Botomian stage,   which lasted from approximately 524 to 518.5 million years ago. This faunal stage was part of the Cambrian Period.

Species 
Cobboldites comleyensis (Cobbold, 1910)  is from the lower Cambrian of Comley Quarry, Shropshire, England.

Cobboldites itsariensis Geyer, 1988.  is from the Lower Cambrian of Morocco.

References

Cambrian trilobites
Fossils of Great Britain
Fossils of Poland
Weymouthiidae 
Agnostida genera